Lee Chae-yeon (born January 11, 2000), better known as the mononym Chaeyeon, is a South Korean singer, dancer, and songwriter. She is known as the former member of the Japanese-Korean girl group Iz*One after placing 12th place on Mnet's girl group survival show Produce 48. Chaeyeon made her solo debut with the extended play Hush Rush on October 12, 2022.

Early life
Chaeyeon was born on January 11, 2000, in Yongin, South Korea. She attended Seocheon High School and graduated in February 2020. She has two younger sisters, Chaeryeong of Itzy and Chaemin.

Career

2013–2017: K-pop Star 3 and Sixteen

Chaeyeon appeared for the first time on television along with her younger sister, Chaeryeong, during the 3rd season of K-pop Star. Both she and her sister were eliminated from the show, however, they were able to join JYP Entertainment as trainees.

Then in 2015, she participated in Mnet's reality survival show Sixteen, which eventually determined the members of girl group Twice. She was eliminated in the 3rd episode of Sixteen and was unable to debut. Sometime after being eliminated from Sixteen, she eventually left JYP and joined WM Entertainment.

2018–2021: Produce 48, debut with Iz*One, and solo activities

From June 15 to August 31, 2018, Lee represented WM Entertainment on reality girl group survival show Produce 48. 

She eventually placed 12th and debuted with Iz*One. The group's debut extended play (EP) Color*Iz was released on October 29, 2018, with "La Vie en Rose" serving as its lead single.

On April 29, 2021, Iz*One disbanded after the group's contract expired. On July 11, 2021, it was announced that she would be participating in the reality TV show Street Woman Fighter as one of the Want dance crew members. The crew was eliminated on the 6th episode. In September, it was announced Lee and former Iz*One members  Jo Yu-ri and Kang Hye-won would-be hosts in a new web show titled Adola Travel Agency: Cheat-ing Trip.

On December 13, 2021, Lee acted alongside Kang Chan-hee in a short promotional video for Busan Tourism Organization.

2022: Debut with Hush Rush
On September 15, 2022, WM Entertainment confirmed that Chaeyeon would be making her solo debut in October. On September 21, a teaser was posted announcing her debut extended play, Hush Rush, which was released on October 12, 2022, along with the title track of the same name and its accompanying music video.

Discography

Extended plays

Singles

Composition credits
All song credits are adapted from the Korea Music Copyright Association's database unless stated otherwise.

Filmography

Television series

Television shows

Web shows

Music videos appearances

Notes

References

External links
 
  

2000 births
Living people
People from Yongin
Iz*One members
21st-century South Korean women singers
Produce 48 contestants
K-pop Star participants
South Korean dance musicians
South Korean female idols
South Korean women pop singers
South Korean women singer-songwriters
Japanese-language singers of South Korea